Project Pericles Inc. is a non-profit organization composed of liberal arts colleges and universities geared towards the ideas that social responsibility and participatory citizenship are essential parts of an undergraduate curriculum, in the classroom, on campus, and in the community.

Background
Conceived by Eugene M. Lang, a retired businessman known for his educational philanthropy, Project Pericles seeks to counter the growing political cynicism and civic disengagement of young people. Convinced that higher education must promote social and civic engagement, in 1999 Lang organized a planning committee and consulted with college presidents, trustees, faculty, students, and others. By the end of 2000, the objectives, policies, and startup plans of Project Pericles were set. Ten colleges and universities became “founding Pericleans.”   

The Boards of the Pericleans formally committed their institutions to the policies and objectives of Project Pericles. Their presidents formed a Presidents’ Council to cooperate in policy-making and program development and implementation. The planning committee became the board of directors. Distinguished educational, business, political, and community leaders became the national board of advisors. 

In April 2003, the first ten Pericleans met in New York for the first national conference of Project Pericles. Delegates included presidents, provosts, deans, faculty, students, and alumni. In August 2003, Project Pericles established an independent office and hired Karen E. Holt as executive director. In November 2005, Jan R. Liss became its second executive director.

In 2004 and 2005, a select group of new Pericleans added to the diversity of Project Pericles. The spirit of Pericleans and cumulative experience continue to strengthen Project Pericles in its mission as a transforming force for higher education.

Periclean programs 

 Debating for Democracy (D4D)™
 Periclean Faculty Leadership (PFL) Program™
 Student Choices - Student Voices (SCSV)
 Creating Curricular Coherence
 Creating Cohesive Pathways to Civic Engagement
 Study of Civic Engagement and Wellness

Members

Allegheny College
Bates College
Berea College
Bethune-Cookman University
Carleton College
Chatham University
Dillard University
Drew University
Elon University
The Evergreen State College
Goucher College
Hampshire College
Hendrix College
Macalester College
Morehouse College
New England College
The New School
Occidental College
Pace University
Pitzer College
Reed College
Rensselaer Polytechnic Institute
Rhodes College
Skidmore College
Swarthmore College
Ursinus College
Wagner College
Whitman College
Widener University
The College of Wooster

External links
Project Pericles, Inc.
The Lang Center - Swarthmore College
Students in Action - PBS
Project Pericles' Strengthens CPSC Work with Local Communities - Hampshire College
The Open Mind - PBS
National Civic Review

2000 establishments in the United States
Educational organizations based in the United States
Liberal arts education
Organizations established in 2000